The Solo free routine competition of the 2022 European Aquatics Championships was held on 11 and 14 August 2022.

Results
The preliminary round was held on 11 August at 09:30. The final round was held on 14 August at 09:30.

References

Artistic